Ki Tavo, Ki Thavo, Ki Tabo, Ki Thabo, or Ki Savo ( — Hebrew for "when you enter," the second and third words, and the first distinctive words, in the parashah) is the 50th weekly Torah portion (parashah) in the annual Jewish cycle of Torah reading and the seventh in the Book of Deuteronomy. It comprises . The parashah tells of the ceremony of the first fruits (bikkurim), tithes, and the blessings from observance and curses (tocheichah) from violation of the law.

The parashah is made up of 6,811 Hebrew letters, 1,747 Hebrew words, 122 verses, and 261 lines in a Torah Scroll (Sefer Torah). Jews generally read it in September, or rarely in late August.

Readings
In traditional Sabbath Torah reading, the parashah is divided into seven readings, aliyot. In the Masoretic Text of the Tanakh (Hebrew Bible), Parashah Ki Tavo has four "open portion" (petuchah) divisions (roughly equivalent to paragraphs, often abbreviated with the Hebrew letter  (peh)). Parashah Ki Tavo has several further subdivisions, called "closed portion" (setumah) divisions (abbreviated with the Hebrew letter  (samekh)) within the open portion divisions. The first open portion spans the first three readings. The second open portion contains all of the fourth and fifth readings and part of the sixth reading. The third open portion constitutes the balance of the sixth reading, which enumerates a series of curses. The fourth open portion is identical with the seventh reading. Closed portion divisions coincide with the first two readings. Closed portion divisions further divide the fourth, fifth, and sixth readings, and a string of 11 closed portion divisions set off a series of curses in the fifth reading.

First reading — Deuteronomy 26:1–11
In the first reading (aliyah), Moses directed the Israelites that when they entered the land that God was giving them, they were to take some of every first fruit of the soil that they harvested, put it in a basket, and take it to the place God would choose. There they were to go to the priest in charge and acknowledge that they had entered the land that God swore to their fathers. The priest was to set the basket down in front of the altar. They were then to recite:

"A wandering Aramean was my father, and he went down into Egypt, and sojourned there, few in number; and he became there a nation, great, mighty, and populous. And the Egyptians dealt ill with us, and afflicted us, and laid upon us hard bondage. And we cried to the Lord, the God of our fathers, and the Lord heard our voice, and saw our affliction, and our toil, and our oppression. And the Lord brought us forth out of Egypt with a mighty hand, and with an outstretched arm, and with great terribleness, and with signs, and with wonders. And He has brought us into this place, and has given us this land, a land flowing with milk and honey. And now, behold, I have brought the first of the fruit of the land, that You, O Lord, have given me."

They were to leave the basket before the altar, bow low to God, and then feast on and enjoy, together with the Levite and the stranger, the bounty that God had given them. The first reading (aliyah) and a closed portion (setumah) end here.

Second reading — Deuteronomy 26:12–15
In the second reading (aliyah), Moses instructed that when the Israelites had given the tenth part of their yield to the Levite, the stranger, the fatherless, and the widow, in the third year, the year of the tithe, they were to declare before God:

"'I have put away the hallowed things out of my house, and also have given them to the Levite, the stranger, the fatherless, and the widow, according to Your commandment that You have commanded me; I have not transgressed any of Your commandments, neither have I forgotten them. I have not eaten thereof in my mourning, neither have I put away thereof, being unclean, nor given thereof for the dead; I have hearkened to the voice of the Lord my God, I have done according to all that You have commanded me. Look from Your holy habitation, from heaven, and bless Your people Israel, and the land that You have given us, as You swore to our fathers, a land flowing with milk and honey."

The second reading (aliyah) and a closed portion (setumah) end here.

Third reading — Deuteronomy 26:16–19
In the third reading (aliyah), Moses exhorted the Israelites to observe these laws faithfully with all their heart and soul, noting that they had affirmed that the Lord was their God and that they would obey God. And God affirmed that the Israelites were God's treasured people, and that God would set them high above all the nations in fame and glory, and that they would be a holy people to God. The third reading (aliyah) and the first open portion (petuchah) end here with the end of chapter .

Fourth reading — Deuteronomy 27:1–10
In the fourth reading (aliyah), Moses and the elders charged the people that as soon as they had crossed the Jordan River, they were to set up large stones on Mount Ebal, coat them with plaster, and inscribe on them all the words of the Torah. There they were also to build an altar to God made of stones on which no iron tool had struck, and they were to offer on it offerings to God and rejoice.

In the continuation of the reading, Moses and the priests told all Israel to hear: They had become the people of God, and should heed God and observe God's commandments. The fourth reading (aliyah) and a closed portion (setumah) end here.

Fifth reading — Deuteronomy 27:11–28:6
In the fifth reading (aliyah), Moses charged the people that after they had crossed the Jordan, the tribes of Simeon, Levi, Judah, Issachar, Joseph, and Benjamin were to stand on Mount Gerizim when the blessings were spoken, and the tribes of Reuben, Gad, Asher, Zebulun, Dan, and Naphthali were to stand on Mount Ebal when the curses were spoken. The Levites were then to loudly curse anyone who: made a sculptured image; insulted father or mother; moved a fellow countryman's landmark; misdirected a blind person; subverted the rights of the stranger, the fatherless, or the widow; lay with his father's wife; lay with any beast; lay with his sister; lay with his mother-in-law; struck down his fellow countryman in secret; accepted a bribe in a murder case; or otherwise would not observe the commandments; and for each curse all the people were to say, "Amen." Eleven closed portion (setumah) divisions set apart each of the curses, and the curses bring chapter  to an end.

In the continuation of the reading, Moses taught that, on the other hand, if the Israelites obeyed God and observed faithfully all the commandments, then God would set them high above all the nations of the earth; bless them in the city and the country; bless the issue of their wombs, the produce of their soil, and the fertility of their herds and flocks; bless their basket and their kneading bowl; and bless them in their comings and goings. The fifth reading (aliyah) ends here.

Sixth reading — Deuteronomy 28:7–69

In the sixth reading (aliyah), Moses continued that if the Israelites obeyed God and observed faithfully all the commandments, then God would rout their enemies; bless them upon their barns and all their undertakings; bless them in the land; establish them as God's holy people; give them abounding prosperity; provide rain in season; and make them the head and not the tail. The second open portion (petuchah) ends here.

In the continuation of the reading, Moses taught that if they did not obey God and observe faithfully the commandments, then God would curse them in the city and the country; curse their basket and kneading bowl; curse the issue of their womb, the produce of their soil, and the fertility of their herds and flocks; curse them in their comings and goings; loose on them calamity, panic, and frustration in all their enterprises; make pestilence cling to them; strike them with tuberculosis, fever, inflammation, scorching heat, drought, blight, and mildew; turn the skies into copper and the earth into iron; make the rain into dust; rout them before their enemies; and strike them with the Egyptian inflammation, hemorrhoids, boil-scars, itch, madness, blindness, and dismay. If they paid the bride price for a wife, another man would enjoy her; if they built a house, they would not live in it; if they planted a vineyard, they would not harvest it. Their oxen would be slaughtered before their eyes, but they would not eat of it; their donkey would be seized and not returned; their flock would be delivered to their enemies; their sons and daughters would be delivered to another people; a people they did not know would eat the produce of their soil; they would be abused and downtrodden continually, until they were driven mad; God would afflict them at the knees and thighs with a severe inflammation; God would drive them to an unknown nation where they would serve other gods, of wood and stone; and they would be a byword among all the peoples. Locusts would consume their seed, worms would devour their vineyards, the olives would drop off their olive trees, their sons and daughters would go into captivity, the cricket would take over all the trees and produce of their land, the stranger in their midst would rise above them, the stranger would be their creditor, and the stranger would be the head and they the tail. Because they would not serve God in joy over abundance, they would have to serve in hunger, thirst, and nakedness, the enemies whom God would let loose against them. God would bring against them a ruthless nation from afar, whose language they would not understand, to devour their cattle and produce of their soil and to shut them up in their towns until every mighty wall in which they trusted had come down. And when they were shut up under siege, they would eat the flesh of their sons and daughters. God would inflict extraordinary plagues and diseases on them until they would have a scant few left, for as God once delighted in making them prosperous and many, so would God delight in causing them to perish and diminish. God would scatter them among all the peoples from one end of the earth to the other, but even among those nations, they would find no place to rest. In the morning they would say, "If only it were evening!" and in the evening they would say, "If only it were morning!" God would send them back to Egypt in galleys and they would offer themselves for sale as slaves, but none would buy. The long closed portion (setumah) of the curses ends here.

The reading concludes with a summary statement that this is the covenant that God commanded Moses to make with the Israelites in Moab, in addition to the covenant that God made with the Israelites at Horeb (Mount Sinai). The sixth reading (aliyah) and the third open portion (petuchah) end here with the end of chapter .

Seventh reading — Deuteronomy 29:1–8
In the seventh reading (aliyah), Moses reminded the Israelites that they had seen all that God did to Pharaoh and Egypt, yet they did not yet understand. Moses led them through the wilderness 40 years, their clothes and sandals did not wear out, and they survived without bread to eat and wine to drink, so that they might know that the Lord was their God.

In the maftir reading of  that concludes the parashah, Moses recounted that the Israelites defeated King Sihon of Heshbon and King Og of Bashan, took their land, and gave it to the Reubenites, the Gadites, and the half-tribe of Manasseh. Therefore, Moses urged them to observe faithfully all the commandments, that they might succeed in all that they undertook. The seventh reading (aliyah), the fourth open portion (petuchah), and the parashah end here.

Readings according to the triennial cycle
Jews who read the Torah according to the triennial cycle of Torah reading read the parashah according to the following schedule:

In ancient parallels
The parashah has parallels in these ancient sources:

Deuteronomy chapter 27
Similarly, the Middle Egyptian (early second millennium BCE) tale of Sinuhe Palestine described the Land of Israel or, as the Egyptian tale called it, the land of Yaa: "It was a good land called Yaa. Figs were in it and grapes. It had more wine than water. Abundant was its honey, plentiful its oil. All kind of fruit were on its trees. Barley was there and emmer, and no end of cattle of all kinds."

In inner-biblical interpretation
The parashah has parallels or is discussed in these Biblical sources:

Deuteronomy chapter 26

Shavuot
 set out the ceremony for the bringing of the first fruits (bikkurim). , in turn, associates the Festival of Shavuot with the first fruits (bikurei) of the wheat harvest.

In the Hebrew Bible, Shavuot is called:
The Feast of Weeks (Chag Shavuot);
The Day of the first fruits (Yom haBikurim);
The Feast of Harvest (Chag haKatzir); and
A holy convocation (mikrah kodesh).

To arrive at the correct date,  instructs counting seven weeks from the day after the day of rest of Passover, the day that they brought the sheaf of barley for waving. Similarly,  directs counting seven weeks from when they first put the sickle to the standing barley.

 sets out a course of offerings for the fiftieth day, including a meal-offering of two loaves made from fine flour from the first fruits of the harvest; burnt-offerings of seven lambs, one bullock, and two rams; a sin-offering of a goat; and a peace-offering of two lambs. Similarly,  sets out a course of offerings including a meal-offering; burnt-offerings of two bullocks, one ram, and seven lambs; and one goat to make atonement.  directs a freewill-offering in relation to God's blessing.

 and  ordain a holy convocation in which the Israelites were not to work.

 reports that Solomon offered burnt-offerings on the Feast of Weeks.

Corpse contamination
The discussion of the dead in the profession associated with tithing, is one of a series of passages setting out the teaching that contact with the dead is antithetical to purity.

In , God instructed Moses to direct the priests not to allow themselves to become defiled by contact with the dead, except for a mother, father, son, daughter, brother, or unmarried sister. And the priests were not to engage in mourning rituals of making baldness upon their heads, shaving off the corners of their beards, or cutting their flesh.

In , God instructed Moses to command the Israelites to put out of the camp every person defiled by contact with the dead, so that they would not defile their camps, in the midst of which God dwelt.

 sets out a procedure for a red cow mixture for decontamination from corpse contamination.

In its profession associated with tithing,  instructed Israelites to aver that they had not eaten from the tithe in mourning, nor put away any of it while unclean, nor given any of it to the dead.

In , the prophet Ezekiel cites the burial of kings within the Temple as one of the practices that defiled the Temple and cause God to abandon it.

Deuteronomy chapter 27
, which prohibits wielding iron tools over the stones of the altar and requires that the Israelites build the altar from unhewn stones, echoes , which prohibits building the altar from hewn stones, explaining that wielding tools upon the stones would profane them.

Professor John J. Collins of Yale Divinity School noted that  describe a ceremony in which the tribes of Israel stand on two mountains that overlook the town of Shechem, and  describes a covenant renewal ceremony at Shechem after the Israelites had occupied the land.

I will be their God, and they will be my people".

Deuteronomy chapter 28

 foretold that the Israelites would be reduced in number after having been as numerous as the stars, echoing God's promise in  that Abraham's descendants would as numerous as the stars of heaven. In , God reminded Isaac that God had promised Abraham that God would make his heirs as numerous as the stars. In , Jacob reminded God that God had promised that Jacob's descendants would be as numerous as the sands. In , Moses reminded God that God had promised to make the Patriarch's descendants as numerous as the stars. In , Moses reported that God had multiplied the Israelites until they were then as numerous as the stars.

In early nonrabbinic interpretation
The parashah has parallels or is discussed in these early nonrabbinic sources:

Deuteronomy chapter 27
Philo interpreted the curses of  regarding moving landmarks and misleading the blind to apply allegorically to virtue and vice. Philo noted that Moses included among his curses (in ) removing a neighbor's landmark, and Philo interpreted the landmark to represent virtue, which God placed before humankind as the tree of life (in ) to be a law for the soul. But pleasure, taught Philo, removed this landmark of virtue, placing in its stead the landmark of vice, the tree of death. Philo taught that pleasure was therefore worthy to be cursed, being a passion, which altered the boundaries of the soul, rendering the soul a lover of the passions instead of a lover of virtue. And thus Philo interpreted , "And the Lord God said to the serpent, '... You are cursed over every creature and over all the beasts of the field,'" to apply to the passion of pleasure. And Philo read , "Cursed is he who causes the blind man to wander in the road," also to speak of pleasure. Philo taught that impious pleasure caused the blind to wander, for the outward sense, devoid of reason, is blinded by nature, and the eyes of its reason are put out. Philo taught that it is by reason alone that we attain a true comprehension of things, and not by the outward senses. Pleasure deceived the outward senses, persuading the outward senses to follow a blind guide, making the mind utterly unable to restrain itself. Only through reason does the mind see clearly, and mischievous things become less formidable in their attacks. But pleasure has put such great artifices in operation to injure the soul that it has compelled the soul to use them as guides, cheating it, and persuading it to exchange virtue for evil habits and vice.

And, he taught, one has a duty not to consider it a matter for sport to hinder others by setting them on the wrong way.

Deuteronomy chapter 28
Echoing the command of  that the Israelites "shall not turn aside from any of the words which I command you this day, to the right hand, or to the left," the Community Rule of the Qumran sectarians provided, "They shall not depart from any command of God concerning their times; they shall be neither early nor late for any of their appointed times, they shall stray neither to the right nor to the left of any of His true precepts."

In classical rabbinic interpretation
The parashah is discussed in these rabbinic sources from the era of the Mishnah and the Talmud:

Deuteronomy chapter 26

The Mishnah taught that to set aside first fruits (bikkurim), a landowner would go down into the field, see a fruit that ripened, tie a reed-rope around it, and say, "These are first fruits." But Rabbi Simeon said that even if the landowner did this, the landowner still had to designate the fruits as first fruits again after they had been picked.

The Mishnah thus taught that people who planted trees but bent their branches into or over another's property could not bring first fruits from those trees. And for the same reason, the Mishnah taught that tenants, lessees, occupiers of confiscated property, or robbers could not bring first fruits.

The Mishnah taught that first fruits (bikkurim) were brought only from the Seven Species (Shiv'at HaMinim) that  noted to praise the Land of Israel: wheat, barley, grapes, figs, pomegranates, olive oil, and date honey. But first fruits could not be brought from dates grown on hills, or from valley-fruits, or from olives that were not of the choice kind. The Mishnah deduced from the words "the feast of harvest, the first fruits of your labors, which you sow in the field" in  that first fruits were not to be brought before Shavuot.

Rabbi Meir, however, said that the owner of the two trees had to bring and recite.

The inhabitants of the district assembled in a city of the district and spent the night in the town square. Early in the morning, their leader said: "Let us rise and go up to Zion, to the house of the Lord our God." Those who lived near Jerusalem brought fresh figs and grapes, and those who lived far away brought dried figs and raisins. Leading the pilgrimage procession was an ox with horns overlaid with gold wearing a crown of olive branches. The sounds of the flute announced the pilgrims' coming until they neared Jerusalem when they sent messengers ahead and arranged their first fruits (bikkurim) for presentation. A delegation of the Temple's leaders and treasurers came out to meet them, varying in relation to the procession. Jerusalem's artisans would stand and greet them, saying: "People of such and such a place, we welcome you." They played the flute until they reached the Temple Mount. On the Temple Mount, even King Agrippa would carry the basket of first fruits on his shoulder and walk to the Temple Court. As the procession approached the Temple Court, Levites would sing the words of  "I will extol You, O Lord, for You have raised me up, and have not suffered my enemies to rejoice over me."

The pilgrims offered turtle doves that had been tied to the basket as burnt offerings. And they gave what they held in their hands to the priests. While the pilgrims still held the basket on their shoulders, they would recite . Rabbi Judah said that they read only through , "A wandering Aramean was my father." When they reached these words, the pilgrims took the baskets off their shoulders and held them by their edges. The priests would put their hands beneath the baskets and wave them while the pilgrims recited from "A wandering Aramean was my father" through the end of the passage. The pilgrims would then deposit their baskets by the side of the altar, bow, and leave.

The Gemara cited two textual proofs for the instruction of Mishnah Bikkurim 2:4 that one waved the first fruits (bikkurim). The Gemara explained that these words could not refer literally to setting the basket down because  already accounted for setting the basket down. The Gemara explained that it was possible for both the priest and the donor to perform the waving because the priest placed his hand under the hand of the donor and they waved the basket together.

Originally, all who knew how to recite would recite, while those unable to do so would repeat after the priest. But when the number of pilgrims declined, it was decided that all pilgrims would repeat the words after the priest.

The rich brought their first fruits (bikkurim) in baskets overlaid with silver or gold, while the poor used wicker baskets. Pilgrims would give both the first fruits and the baskets to the priest.

Rabbi Simeon ben Nanos said that the pilgrims could decorate their first fruits (bikkurim) with produce other than the seven species, but Rabbi Akiva said that they could decorate only with produce of the seven kinds. Rabbi Simeon taught that there were three elements to the first fruits (bikkurim): the first fruits themselves, the additions to the first fruits, and the ornamentations of the first fruits. The additions to the first fruits had to be like the first fruits, but the ornamental fruit could be of another kind. The additions to the first fruits could only be eaten in Levitical purity, and were exempt from the law of doubts as to tithing (demai), but the fruits used for ornamentations were subject to the law of doubts as to tithing.

Rabbi Berekiah in Rabbi Levi's name read  to say, "The blessing of the destroyer (oved) came upon me," and interpreted "The blessing of the destroyer (oved)" to allude to Laban the Syrian. Rabbi Berekiah in Rabbi Levi's name thus read  to say, "An Aramean (Laban) sought to destroy (oved) my father (Jacob)." This interpretation thus reads , oved, as a transitive verb.) Rabbi Berekiah and Rabbi Levi in the name of Rabbi Hama ben Haninah thus explained that Rebekah was remembered with the blessing of children only after Isaac prayed for her, so that the heathens in Rebekah's family might not say that their prayer in  caused that result. Rather, God answered Isaac's prayer, as  reports, "And Isaac entreated the Lord for his wife . . . and his wife Rebekah conceived."

Once when Rami bar Ezekiel visited Bnei Brak, he saw goats grazing under fig trees while honey was flowing from the figs, and milk dripped from the goats mingling with the fig honey, causing him to remark that it was indeed a land flowing with milk and honey. Rabbi Jacob ben Dostai said that it is about three miles from Lod to Ono, and once he rose up early in the morning and waded all that way up to his ankles in fig honey. Resh Lakish said that he saw the flow of the milk and honey of Sepphoris extend over an area of sixteen miles by sixteen miles. Rabbah bar Bar Hana said that he saw the flow of the milk and honey in all the Land of Israel and the total area was equal to an area of twenty-two parasangs by six parasangs.

Mishnah Peah 8:5–9, Tosefta Peah 4:2–10, and Jerusalem Talmud Peah 69b–73b interpreted  and  regarding the tithe given to the poor and the Levite. The Mishnah thus taught that they did not give the poor person at the threshing floor less than a half a kav (the equivalent in volume of 12 eggs, or roughly a liter) of wheat or a kav (roughly two liters) of barley. The Mishnah taught that they did not give the poor person wandering from place to place less than a loaf of bread. If the poor person stayed overnight, they gave the poor person enough to pay for a night's lodging. If the poor person stayed for the Sabbath, they gave the poor person three meals. The Mishnah taught that if one wanted to save some for poor relatives, one could take only half for poor relatives and needed to give at least half to other poor people.

And for those who do not give to the poor, it is accounted to them as if the Temple existed and they did not offer up their sacrifices in it.

The Mishnah recounted that Johanan the High Priest abolished the confession over the tithe. Rabbi Jose bar Hanina reported that Johanan the High Priest did so because people were not presenting the tithe as mandated by the Torah. For God commanded that the Israelites should give it to the Levites, but (since the days of Ezra) they presented it to the priests instead.

Deuteronomy chapter 27
The Mishnah told that the stones of the Temple's altar and ramp came from the valley of Beit Kerem. A stone was also unfit if it was chipped through any means. They whitewashed the walls and top of the altar twice a year, on Passover and Sukkot, and they whitewashed the vestibule once a year, on Passover. Rabbi (Judah the Patriarch) said that they cleaned them with a cloth every Friday because of blood stains. They did not apply the whitewash with an iron trowel, out of the concern that the iron trowel would touch the stones and render them unfit, for iron was created to shorten humanity's days, and the altar was created to extend humanity's days, and it is not proper that that which shortens humanity's days be placed on that which extends humanity's days.

The Tosefta reported that Rabban Joḥanan ben Zakkai said that  singled out iron, of all metals, to be invalid for use in building the altar because one can make a sword from it. The sword is a sign of punishment, and the altar is a sign of atonement. They thus kept that which is a sign of punishment away from that which is a sign of atonement. Because stones, which do not hear or speak, bring atonement between Israel and God,  says, "you shall lift up no iron tool upon them." So children of Torah, who atone for the world — how much more should no force of injury come near to them. Similarly,  says, "You shall build the altar of the Lord your God of unhewn stones." Because the stones of the altar secure the bond between Israel and God, God said that they should be whole before God. Children of Torah, who are whole for all time — how much more should they be deemed whole (and not wanting) before God.

Rabbi Judah ben Bathyra taught that in the days of the Temple in Jerusalem, Jews could not rejoice without meat (from an offering), as  says, "And you shall sacrifice peace-offerings, and shall eat there; and you shall rejoice before the Lord your God." But now that the Temple no longer exists, Jews cannot rejoice without wine, as  says, "And wine gladdens the heart of man."

The Gemara reasoned through a verbal analogy that Moses also wrote down the Torah on stones in the land of Moab and erected them there. The Gemara concluded that there were thus three sets of stones so inscribed. Rabbi Judah taught that the Israelites inscribed the Torah on the stones, as  says, "You shall write upon the stones all the words of this law," and after that they plastered them over with plaster. Rabbi Simeon asked Rabbi Judah how then the people of that time learned the Torah (as the inscription would have been covered with plaster). Rabbi Judah replied that God endowed the people of that time with exceptional intelligence, and they sent their scribes, who peeled off the plaster and carried away a copy of the inscription. On that account, the verdict was sealed for them to descend into the pit of destruction, because it was their duty to learn Torah, but they failed to do so. And Rabbi Simeon taught that if people of the nations then repented, they would be accepted. Rava bar Shila taught that Rabbi Simeon's reason for teaching that the Israelites inscribed the Torah on the plaster was because  says, "And the peoples shall be as the burnings of plaster." That is, the people of the other nations would burn on account of the matter on the plaster (and because they failed to follow the teachings written on the plaster). Rabbi Judah, however, explained  to mean that their destruction would be like plaster: Just as there is no other remedy for plaster except burning (for burning is the only way to obtain plaster), so there was no remedy for those nations (who cleave to their abominations) other than burning.

Rabbi Judah asked whether it was on that day that the Torah was given to Israel; was that day not at the end of the 40 years of the wandering in the Wilderness? Rabbi Judah explained that the words "this day" served to teach that every day the Torah is as beloved to those who study it as on the day when God gave it at Mount Sinai.

Our Rabbis asked in a Baraita why  says, "You shall set the blessing upon Mount Gerizim and the curse upon mount Ebal."  cannot say so merely to teach where the Israelites were to say the blessings and curses, as  already says, "These shall stand upon Mount Gerizim to bless the people . . . and these shall stand upon Mount Ebal for the curse." It is possible to think that all the blessings must precede all the curses; therefore, the text states "blessing" and "curse" in the singular, and thus teaches that one blessing precedes one curse, alternating blessings and curses, and all the blessings do not proceed all the curses. As the curse was uttered in a loud voice, so the blessing had to be uttered in a loud voice. As the curse was said in Hebrew, so the blessing had to be said in Hebrew. As the curses were in general and particular terms, so must the blessings had to be in general and particular terms. And as with the curse, both parties respond "Amen," so with the blessing both parties respond "Amen."

The Mishnah told how the Levites pronounced the blessings and curses. When the Israelites crossed the Jordan and came to Mount Gerizim and Mount Ebal, six tribes ascended Mount Gerizim and six tribes ascended Mount Ebal. The priests and Levites with the Ark of the Covenant stationed themselves below in the center. The priests surrounded the Ark, the Levites surrounded the priests, and all the Israelites stood on this side and that of the Levites, as  says, "And all Israel, and their elders and officers, and their judges stood on this side the ark and on that side." The Levites turned their faces towards Mount Gerizim and opened with the blessing: "Blessed be the man who does not make a graven or molten image," and all the Israelites responded, "Amen." Then the Levites turned their faces towards Mount Ebal and opened with the curse of  "Cursed be the man who makes a graven or molten image," and all the Israelites responded, "Amen." So they continued until they had completed all the blessings and curses.

Rabbi Judah ben Nahmani, the interpreter of Simeon ben Lakish (Resh Lakish), taught that the whole section of the blessings and curses refers to adultery.  says, "Cursed be the man who makes a graven or molten image." Is it enough merely to curse such a person in this world? Rather, Rabbi Judah ben Naḥmani taught that  alludes to one who commits adultery and has a son who goes to live among idolaters and worships idols; cursed be the father and mother of this man, as they were the cause of his sinning.

A Midrash noted that almost everywhere, including , Scripture mentions a father's honor before the mother's honor. But  mentions the mother first to teach that one should honor both parents equally.

Rabbi Eliezer the Great taught that the Torah warns against wronging a stranger in 36, or others say 46, places (including ). The Gemara taught that thus a proverb says: If there is a case of hanging in a person's family history, do not say to the person, "Hang up this fish for me."

According to the Pirke De-Rabbi Eliezer, anyone who secretly slanders a neighbor has no remedy, as  says, "Whoso privately slanders his neighbor, him will I destroy: him that has a high look and a proud heart will I not suffer."

Rabbi Aha said in the name of Rabbi Tanhum that if a person studies Torah and teaches it, observes and performs its precepts, but has the means to support needy scholars and fails to do so, then that person comes within the words of  "Cursed be he who does not confirm the words of this law." But if a person studies and does not teach or observe or perform the precepts, and does not have the means to support needy scholars and yet does so by self-denial, then that person comes within the category of "Blessed be he who confirms the words of this law," for every "cursed" implies a "blessed." Similarly, a Midrash taught that had  read, "Cursed be he who does not learn the words of the law," then Israel would not have been able to survive, but  reads, "who does not confirm the words of this law," and so the Hebrew implies that one may avoid the curse through the maintenance of Torah students and colleges.

A Midrash taught that there is nothing greater before God than the "amen" that Israel answers. Rabbi Judah ben Sima taught that the word "amen" contains three kinds of solemn declarations: oath, consent, and confirmation.  demonstrates oath when it says, "Then the priest shall cause the woman to swear . . . and the woman shall say: 'Amen, Amen.'"  demonstrates consent when it says "And all the people shall say: 'Amen.'" And 1 Kings  demonstrates confirmation when it says, "And Benaiah the son of Jehoiada answered the king, and said: 'Amen; so say the Lord.'"

Then they took the stones and spent the night in their place.

Deuteronomy chapter 28
The Mishnah taught that they did not interrupt the reading of the curses, but had one person read them all. The Gemara explained this distinction by noting that the curses in Leviticus are stated in the plural, and Moses pronounced them from the mouth God, and as such, they are more severe. The curses in Deuteronomy, however, are stated in the singular, and Moses said them on his own, like the rest of the book of Deuteronomy, and are thus considered less harsh.</ref>

A Midrash interpreted  to teach that Moses told Israel to be diligent to listen to the words of the Torah, because whoever listens to the words of the Torah is exalted in both this world and the World to Come. And the Midrash interpreted  to mean that a person is happy whose hearing is devoted to God.

Rabbi Joshua of Siknin in the name of Rabbi Levi interpreted  to convey God's message that if people will heed God's commandments, God will heed their prayers.

Rav interpreted the words, "and blessed shall you be in the field," to mean that your property would be near the city. And Rav interpreted the words, "and blessed shall you be when you go out," to mean that your children would be like you. Rabbi Johanan's interpretation was in accordance with his opinion that one receives reward for walking (some distance) to a synagogue. Rabbi Johanan interpreted the words, "And blessed shall you be in the field," to mean that your estate would be divided into three equal portions of cereals, olives, and vines.

Rabbi Judah bar Simon read , "Blessed shall you be when you come in, and blessed shall you be when you go out," to refer to Moses. Rabbi Judah bar Simon read "when you come in" to refer to Moses, because when he came into the world, he brought nearer to God Batya the daughter of Pharaoh (who by saving Moses from drowning merited life in the World to Come).

And Ben Azzai taught that the performance of one commandment leads to the performance of another commandment, and one sin leads to another sin; and thus the reward for a commandment is another commandment, and the reward for one sin is another sin.

Thus the Sifre read , "All who will be called by the name of the Lord shall be delivered," to teach that just as  calls God "merciful and gracious," we, too, should be merciful and gracious. And just as  says, "The Lord is righteous," we, too, should be righteous.

Rabbi Abin son of Rav Ada in the name of Rabbi Isaac deduced from  that God wears tefillin. For  says: "The Lord has sworn by His right hand, and by the arm of His strength." "By His right hand" refers to the Torah, for  says, "At His right hand was a fiery law to them." "And by the arm of His strength" refers to tefillin, as  says, "The Lord will give strength to His people," and tefillin are a strength to Israel, for  says, "And all the peoples of the earth shall see that the name of the Lord is called upon you, and they shall be afraid of You," and Rabbi Eliezer the Great said that this refers to tefillin of the head (in which the Name of God is written in fulfillment of ).

The curse of  figured in a debate among the Rabbis about whether one should perform a worldly occupation in addition to studying Torah. The Rabbis in a Baraita questioned what was to be learned from the words of  "And you shall gather in your corn and wine and oil." Rabbi Ishmael replied that since  says, "This book of the law shall not depart out of your mouth, but you shall meditate therein day and night," one might think that one must take this injunction literally (and study Torah every waking moment). Therefore,  directs one to "gather in your corn," implying that one should combine Torah study with a worldly occupation. Rabbi Simeon ben Yoḥai questioned that, however, asking if a person plows in plowing season, sows in sowing season, reaps in reaping season, threshes in threshing season, and winnows in the season of wind, when would one find time for Torah? Rather, Rabbi Simeon ben Yoḥai taught that when Israel performs God's will, others perform its worldly work, as  says, "And strangers shall stand and feed your flocks, aliens shall be your plowmen and vine-trimmers; while you shall be called 'Priests of the Lord,' and termed 'Servants of our God.'" And when Israel does not perform God's will, it has to carry out its worldly work by itself, as  says, "And you shall gather in your corn." And not only that, but the Israelites would also do the work of others, as  says, "And you shall serve your enemy whom the Lord will let loose against you. He will put an iron yoke upon your neck until He has wiped you out." Abaye observed that many had followed Rabbi Ishmael's advice to combine secular work and Torah study and it worked well, while others have followed the advice of Rabbi Simeon ben Yoḥai to devote themselves exclusively to Torah study and not succeeded. Rava would ask the Rabbis (his disciples) not to appear before him during Nisan (when corn ripened) and Tishrei (when people pressed grapes and olives) so that they might not be anxious about their food supply during the rest of the year.

The Mishnah taught that when they flogged a person, a reader would read , beginning "If you will not observe to do all the words of this law that are written in this book . . . ," then , "Observe therefore the words of this covenant," and then , "But He, being full of compassion, forgives iniquity."

Rabbi Johanan taught that God does not rejoice in the downfall of the wicked. But God rebuked them: "The work of my hands is being drowned in the sea, and you want to sing songs?" Rabbi Eleazar replied that a close reading of  shows that God does not rejoice personally, but does make others rejoice.

Rabban Simeon ben Gamliel said in the name of Rabbi Joshua that from the day that the Temple was destroyed, there was no day without a curse, the dew had not descended for a blessing, and the flavor had departed from fruits. Rava said that in addition, the curse of each day was severer than that of the preceding day, as  says, "In the morning, you shall say: Would God it were evening! And in the evening, you shall say: Would God it were morning." The Gemara asked which morning they would long for. If it would be the morning of the next day, nobody knows what that will be like. Therefore, reasoned the Gemara, it must have been the morning of the previous day (because the previous day would have been less severe than the current day, and therefore they longed for its return).

In , the heart fears. A Midrash catalogued the wide range of additional capabilities of the heart reported in the Hebrew Bible. The heart speaks, sees, hears, walks, falls, stands, rejoices, cries, is comforted, is troubled, becomes hardened, grows faint, grieves, can be broken, becomes proud, rebels, invents, cavils, overflows, devises, desires, goes astray, lusts, is refreshed, can be stolen, is humbled, is enticed, errs, trembles, is awakened, loves, hates, envies, is searched, is rent, meditates, is like a fire, is like a stone, turns in repentance, becomes hot, dies, melts, takes in words, is susceptible to fear, gives thanks, covets, becomes hard, makes merry, acts deceitfully, speaks from out of itself, loves bribes, writes words, plans, receives commandments, acts with pride, makes arrangements, and aggrandizes itself.

Deuteronomy chapter 29
Reading , "Your clothes have not grown old on you," Rabbi Jose bar Ḥanina taught that the clothes that the Israelites wore did not wear out, but those that they packed away in their trunks did. Alternatively, Rabbi Eleazar, the son of Rabbi Simeon ben Yoḥai, asked his father-in-law Rabbi Simeon ben Jose whether the Israelites had not taken with them leather garments into the wilderness (which would wear out). Rabbi Simeon ben Jose replied that the clothes that they wore were those with which the ministering angels had invested them at Mount Sinai, and therefore they did not grow old. Rabbi Eleazar asked whether the Israelites did not grow so that the clothes became too small for them. Rabbi Simeon ben Jose replied that one should not wonder at this, for when a snail grows, its shell grows with it. Rabbi Eleazar asked whether the clothes did not need washing. Rabbi Simeon ben Jose replied that the pillar of cloud rubbed against them and whitened them. Rabbi Eleazar asked whether they were not scorched, as the cloud consisted of fire. Rabbi Simeon ben Jose replied that one should not wonder at this, as amianthus (a kind of asbestos) is cleansed only by fire, and as their clothes were made in heaven, the cloud rubbed against them without damaging them. Rabbi Eleazar asked whether vermin did not breed in the clothes. Rabbi Simeon ben Jose replied that if in their death no worm could touch the Israelites, how much less could vermin in their lifetime. Rabbi Eleazar asked whether they did not smell because of perspiration. Rabbi Simeon ben Jose replied that they used to play with the sweet-scented grass around the well, as  says, "And the smell of your garments is like the smell of Lebanon."

Rabbi Joshua ben Levi noted that the promise of  that whoever studies the Torah prospers materially is written in the Torah, the Prophets (Nevi'im), and the Writings (Ketuvim). In the Torah,  says: "Observe therefore the words of this covenant, and do them, that you may make all that you do to prosper." And he shall be like a tree planted by streams of water, that brings forth its fruit in its season, and whose leaf does not wither; and in whatever he does he shall prosper."

Rabbi Berekiah interpreted , "I am the man (gever) who has seen affliction by the rod of His wrath," to mean that God strengthened the writer (writing for the people of God) to withstand all afflictions (interpreting , gever, "man," to mean , gibor, "strong man").

In medieval Jewish interpretation
The parashah is discussed in these medieval Jewish sources:

Deuteronomy chapter 26

Maimonides wrote that converts may say such declarations in the prescribed order and not change them in the least, and may bless and pray in the same way as every Jew by birth. Maimonides reasoned that Abraham taught the people, brought many under the wings of the Divine Presence, and ordered members of his household after him to keep God's ways forever. Ever since then, Maimonides taught, whoever adopts Judaism is counted among the disciples of Abraham. They are Abraham's household, and Abraham converted them to righteousness. In the same way that Abraham converted his contemporaries, he converts future generations through the testament that he left behind him. Thus Abraham is the father of his posterity who keep his ways and of all proselytes who adopt Judaism. Therefore, Maimonides counseled converts to pray, "God of our fathers," because Abraham is their father. Maimonides concluded that there is no difference between converts and born Jews. Both should say the blessing, "Who has chosen us," "Who has given us," "Who have taken us for Your own," and "Who has separated us"; for God has chosen converts and separated them from the nations and given them the Torah. For the Torah has been given to born Jews and proselytes alike, as  says, "One ordinance shall be both for you of the congregation, and also for the stranger that sojourns with you, an ordinance forever in your generations; as you are, so shall the stranger be before the Lord." Maimonides counseled converts not to consider their origin as inferior. While born Jews descend from Abraham, Isaac, and Jacob, converts derive from God, through whose word the world was created. As Isaiah said in  "One shall say, I am the Lord's, and another shall call himself by the name of Jacob."

Reading , "And they shall eat in your gates and be satisfied," Maimonides taught that when poor people passed by a field while the owner was in the field and in possession of the tithe for the poor, the owner had to give each poor person who passed a portion of the tithe sufficient to satisfy the poor person.

Deuteronomy chapter 28
Maimonides taught that because idolatrous religions promised great reward in length of life, protection from illness, exemption from bodily deformities, and plenty of produce, Scripture teaches, in order that people should abandon idolatry, that blessings actually flow from the reverse of what the idolatrous priests preached to the people.

Maimonides interpreted , "And you shall walk in His ways," to command a person to walk in intermediate paths, near the midpoint between extremes of character.

Baḥya ibn Paquda read , "that you may fear this glorious and revered Name," as an example of how Scripture ascribes most of its praises to the "Name" of God, as it is impossible to form a representation of God with the intellect or picture God with the imagination. Scripture thus honors and exalts God's essence because, besides apprehending that God exists, it is impossible for people to conceive in our minds anything about God's Being except for God's great Name. Baḥya noted that for this reason, the Torah frequently repeats God's Name.

In modern interpretation
The parashah is discussed in these modern sources:

Deuteronomy chapters 11–29
The 20th century scholar Peter Craigie, formerly of the University of Calgary, saw in  the following chiastic structure centered on the specific legislation, stressing the importance of the blessing and curse contingent upon obedience to the legislation both in the present and in the future.

A: The blessing and curse in the present renewal of the covenant
B: The blessing and curse in the future renewal of the covenant
C: The specific legislation
B1:The blessing and curse in the future renewal of the covenant
A1:The blessing and curse in the present renewal of the covenant

Deuteronomy chapter 26
Oden identified the shape of the current Hebrew Bible with the Nehemiah outline.

Bright concluded that Israel's ancestors and those of the later Arameans were of the same ethnic and linguistic stock, and therefore it was not without reason that Israel could speak of her father as "a wandering Aramean."

Deuteronomy chapter 27
The expression evoked a general sense of the bounty of the land and suggested an ecological richness exhibited in a number of ways, not just with milk and honey. MacDonald noted that the expression was always used to describe a land that the people of Israel had not yet experienced, and thus characterized it as always a future expectation.

Kugel concluded that the Deuteronomist was closely connected to the world of wisdom literature.

Deuteronomy chapter 28
Noting that the array of curses in  dwarf the catalogue of blessings preceding them, the 20th century Reform Rabbi Gunther Plaut argued that this imbalance should not be surprising, for specific negative commandments far outnumber specific positive ones in the Torah, and forbidden behaviors were generally more common in law codes. Plaut taught that the Torah promises and threatens based on the realistic assumption that, while pure love of God and the commandments is the highest rung, such devotion for its own sake can be scaled only by the very few, while the majority will need earthly rewards and punishments held up before their eyes. Plaut reported general scholarly agreement that the vassal treaties of the Assyrian King Esarhaddon influenced these curses. Noting that in the Assyrian model, the suzerain lays down conditions and states what he will do if the vassal complies or fails to comply, Plaut concluded that the Torah's adoption of this treaty form can be seen as part of the Torah's ever-present view of Israel as a covenanted community.

Professor Gerhard von Rad of Heidelberg University in the mid-20th-century argued that the section of curses attracted gradual amplifications after the catastrophe of the exile of 587 BCE.

Deuteronomy chapters 28 and 29
In the majority of modern texts, however, these words form verse 1 of chapter 29. Charles Ellicott argued that the Hebrew Bibles which "add this verse to the previous chapter, and begin Deuteronomy 29 at the second verse . . . cannot be right in so doing. For though the pronoun 'these' in Hebrew has nothing to determine whether it belongs to what precedes or to what follows, yet the context shows that the covenant is described in Deuteronomy 29, not in Deuteronomy 28." Similarly, John Gill argued that the words of the covenant are "not what go before, but follow after, in the next chapters, to the end of the book."

In critical analysis
Some scholars who follow the Documentary Hypothesis find evidence of three separate sources in the parashah. Professor Richard Elliott Friedman, of the University of Georgia, attributed  to the original Deuteronomistic law code (Dtn).

Commandments
According to Maimonides and Sefer ha-Chinuch, there are 3 positive and 3 negative commandments in the parashah.
To make the declaration on bringing the first fruits
To make the tithe declaration
Not to eat the second tithe while unclean, even in Jerusalem, until it has been redeemed
Not to eat the second tithe while mourning
Not to spend redemption money of the second tithe for anything but food and drink
To imitate God's good and upright ways

In the liturgy

The Passover Haggadah, in the magid section of the Seder, quotes and interprets .

The Haggadah quotes  for the proposition that the Israelites had sojourned in Egypt. The Haggadah quotes  for the proposition that the Israelites started few in number. The Haggadah quotes  for the proposition that the Israelites had become "great" and "mighty." And the Haggadah quotes  to elucidate the report in  that the Israelites had nonetheless become "numerous."

Next, the Haggadah cites  to elucidate the report in  that "the Egyptians dealt ill with us [the Israelites], and afflicted us, and laid upon us hard bondage." The Haggadah quotes  for the proposition that the Egyptians attributed evil intentions to the Israelites or dealt ill with them. The Haggadah quotes  for the proposition that the Egyptians afflicted the Israelites. And the Haggadah quotes  for the proposition that the Egyptians imposed hard labor on the Israelites.

The Haggadah quotes  for the proposition that the Israelites cried to God. The Haggadah quotes  for the proposition that God heard the Israelites' voice. The Haggadah quotes  for the proposition that God saw the Israelites' affliction, interpreting that affliction as the suspension of family life. The Haggadah quotes  to explain the Israelites' travail, interpreting that travail as the loss of the baby boys. And the Haggadah quotes  to explain the Israelites' oppression, interpreting that oppression as pressure or persecution.

The Haggadah quotes  for the proposition that God took the Israelites out of Egypt, not through an angel, not through a seraph, not through an agent, but on God's own.

Haftarah
The haftarah is the sixth in the cycle of seven haftarot of consolation after Tisha B'Av, leading up to Rosh Hashanah.

Notes

Further reading

The parashah has parallels or is discussed in these sources:

Ancient
Vassal treaties of Esarhaddon.

Biblical
 (blessings and curses).
 (recited history of Israel).
 (cannibalism).
 (cannibalism).
 (parents eating children).
 (parents eating children);  (unburied carcasses).
 (cannibalism).
 (blessings and curses);  (heart);  (heart);  (God provided food);  (eyes).
 (mothers eating children).
 (recited history of Israel).

Early nonrabbinic
The Temple Scroll 18–19. Dead Sea scroll 11QT=11Q19,20. Land of Israel, 2nd Century B.C.E. In Géza Vermes. The Complete Dead Sea Scrolls in English, pages 190, 195. New York: Penguin Press, 1997. .
Philo. Allegorical Interpretation 3:11:36, 35:107; On the Posterity of Cain and His Exile 8:24, 24:84, 29:99; On the Unchangeableness of God 34:156; Who Is the Heir of Divine Things? 3:10, 15:76, 51:250; On Flight and Finding 22:123; On Dreams, That They Are God-Sent 1:34:193; 2:40:263, 41:272; The Special Laws 2:34–36; On the Virtues 8:47, 21:106; On Rewards and Punishments 21:127, 22:131; Flaccus 20:167. Alexandria, Egypt, early 1st century CE. In, e.g., The Works of Philo: Complete and Unabridged, New Updated Edition. Translated by Charles Duke Yonge, pages 54, 62, 134, 140–41, 171, 276, 282, 297, 332, 382, 407, 588–89, 644, 650, 676, 739. Peabody, Massachusetts: Hendrickson Publishers, 1993. .
Josephus. The Wars of the Jews, 6:3:3–5. Circa 75 CE. In, e.g., The Works of Josephus: Complete and Unabridged, New Updated Edition. Translated by William Whiston, pages 737–38. Peabody, Massachusetts: Hendrickson Publishers, 1987. .
Josephus, Antiquities of the Jews 4:8:18, 22, 31, 44 . Circa 93–94. In, e.g., The Works of Josephus: Complete and Unabridged, New Updated Edition. Translated by William Whiston, pages 118–19, 121, 124. Peabody, Massachusetts: Hendrickson Publishers, 1987. .

Classical rabbinic
Mishnah Maasrot 1:1–5:8; Maaser Sheni 1:1– 5:15; Bikkurim 1:1–3:12; Pesachim 10:4; Megillah 2:5; 3:6; Sotah 7:1, 5, 8; 9:10; Makkot 3:14; Middot 3:4. Land of Israel, circa 200 CE. In, e.g., The Mishnah: A New Translation. Translated by Jacob Neusner, pages 120–47, 166–75, 250, 319, 321, 457–59, 464, 619, 878. New Haven: Yale University Press, 1988. .
Sifre to Deuteronomy 297:1–303:11. Land of Israel, circa 250–350 CE. In, e.g., Sifre to Deuteronomy: An Analytical Translation. Translated by Jacob Neusner, volume 2, pages 269–285. Atlanta: Scholars Press, 1987. .
Tosefta Peah 1:1; Sheviit 7:1–7; Maaser Sheni 5:23, 25–27; Bikkurim 1:1–2:16; Megillah 3:39–40; Sotah 7:10, 17, 19, 22; 8:1, 9; 13:1; Bava Kamma 7:6–7. Land of Israel, circa 250 CE. In, e.g., The Tosefta: Translated from the Hebrew, with a New Introduction. Translated by Jacob Neusner, volume 1, pages 47, 238–40, 329–30, 345–53, 653, 862–65, 867–68, 871, 884; volume 2, page 987. Peabody, Massachusetts: Hendrickson Publishers, 2002. .
Jerusalem Talmud: Berakhot 54b; Peah 31b, 47b, 69b–73b; Sheviit 33a; Terumot 71b; Maasrot 26a, 27b; Maaser Sheni 12b, 13b, 52b, 56b–57a, 58a; Orlah 20a; Bikkurim 1a–26b; Shabbat 24a, 67a, 74a, 92a; Pesachim 84b; Yoma 51b, 53a–b; Sukkah 28b; Taanit 5a, 7a, 17a; Yevamot 68a; Ketubot 40a, 50b; Sotah 24b, 31b–35a, 37a, 38b; Makkot 6a, 11a; Shevuot 4a, 17a, 23a; Avodah Zarah 25b. Tiberias, Land of Israel, circa 400 CE. In, e.g., Talmud Yerushalmi. Edited by Chaim Malinowitz, Yisroel Simcha Schorr, and Mordechai Marcus, volumes 2–3, 6a, 8–10, 12, 13–15, 19, 21–22, 30–32, 36–37, 46, 48–49. Brooklyn: Mesorah Publications, 2006–2020. And in, e.g., The Jerusalem Talmud: A Translation and Commentary. Edited by Jacob Neusner and translated by Jacob Neusner, Tzvee Zahavy, B. Barry Levy, and Edward Goldman. Peabody, Massachusetts: Hendrickson Publishers, 2009. .
Genesis Rabbah 1:15; 13:6; 22:10; 33:6; 60:13; 73:8. Land of Israel, 5th century. In, e.g., Midrash Rabbah: Genesis. Translated by Harry Freedman and Maurice Simon, volume 1, pages 13, 102, 189–90, 265–66; volume 2, pages 536, 670, 672, 752, 828, 896–97, 951. London: Soncino Press, 1939. .

Babylonian Talmud: Berakhot 5a, 6a, 15b, 24a, 35b, 40a–b, 56a, 57a, 63b; Shabbat 25a, 31b, 55b, 138b; Eruvin 55b; Pesachim 24a, 36a–b, 49b, 70b, 109a, 116a; Yoma 5b, 13b, 52b, 74b; Sukkah 40b, 46b, 47b; Beitzah 35b; Rosh Hashanah 12b, 15a; Taanit 2a, 3b, 8b–9b; Megillah 10b–11a, 16b, 20b, 24b, 25b; Moed Katan 15b; Chagigah 3a, 4b, 7a, 12b, 18b; Yevamot 63b, 73a–74b, 103a; Ketubot 111b–12a; Nedarim 22a, 36b, 41a, 84b; Sotah 17a, 32a–33b, 35b, 36a, 37a–38a, 39b, 47a, 48a, 49a; Gittin 47b–48a, 56a, 57b–58a, 81a; Kiddushin 2b, 26a, 66b; Bava Kamma 32b, 82a, 116b; Bava Metzia 11a–b, 52b, 59b, 90a, 96a, 107a; Bava Batra 25b, 26b–27a, 81a–82a, 89a, 136b; Sanhedrin 7a, 11b, 28b, 39b, 44a; Makkot 7b, 13b, 16b–17b, 18b–19b, 22b, 24a; Shevuot 35a, 36a, 39a; Avodah Zarah 5b, 19b, 52b, 55a; Horayot 12a; Zevachim 16a, 50a, 54b, 60b, 61b, 99b, 101a; Menachot 35b, 61a–b, 82a, 84b, 103b; Chullin 16a, 18a, 89a, 120b–21a, 131a–b, 136a; Bekhorot 41a; Arakhin 11a; Temurah 3b, 10a, 21a; Keritot 11a; Niddah 51b. Sasanian Empire, 6th century. In, e.g., Talmud Bavli. Edited by Yisroel Simcha Schorr, Chaim Malinowitz, and Mordechai Marcus, 72 volumes. Brooklyn: Mesorah Publications, 2006.

Medieval
Deuteronomy Rabbah 7:1–7. Land of Israel, 9th century. In, e.g., Midrash Rabbah: Leviticus. Translated by Harry Freedman and Maurice Simon. London: Soncino Press, 1939. .
Rashi. Commentary. Deuteronomy 26–29. Troyes, France, late 11th century. In, e.g., Rashi. The Torah: With Rashi's Commentary Translated, Annotated, and Elucidated. Translated and annotated by Yisrael Isser Zvi Herczeg, volume 5, pages 267–302. Brooklyn: Mesorah Publications, 1997. .

Rashbam. Commentary on the Torah. Troyes, early 12th century. In, e.g., Rashbam's Commentary on Deuteronomy: An Annotated Translation. Edited and translated by Martin I. Lockshin, pages 147–63. Providence, Rhode Island: Brown Judaic Studies, 2004. .
Judah Halevi. Kuzari. 2:55; 3:11. Toledo, Spain, 1130–1140. In, e.g., Jehuda Halevi. Kuzari: An Argument for the Faith of Israel. Introduction by Henry Slonimsky, pages 116–17, 144, 148. New York: Schocken, 1964. .
Abraham ibn Ezra. Commentary on the Torah. Mid-12th century. In, e.g., Ibn Ezra's Commentary on the Pentateuch: Deuteronomy (Devarim). Translated and annotated by H. Norman Strickman and Arthur M. Silver, volume 5, pages 188–212. New York: Menorah Publishing Company, 2001. .
Letter from Ephriam ben Isaac to Moses. Egypt, 12th century. In Mark R. Cohen. The Voice of the Poor in the Middle Ages: An Anthology of Documents from the Cairo Geniza, 72. Princeton: Princeton University Press, 2005. .

Maimonides. Mishneh Torah, Introduction, 26. Cairo, Egypt, 1170–1180.
Maimonides. Mishneh Torah: Hilchot Matnot Aniyim (The Law of Gifts to the Poor), chapter 6, halachah 7. Egypt, circa 1170–1180. In, e.g., Mishneh Torah: Sefer Zeraim: The Book of Agricultural Ordinances. Translated by Eliyahu Touger, pages 156–57. New York: Moznaim Publishing, 2005. .
Maimonides. Letter to Obadiah the Proselyte. Spain, 12th century. In, e.g., A Treasury of Jewish Letters: Letters from the Famous and the Humble. Edited by Franz Kobler, volume 1, pages 194–96. Philadelphia: Jewish Publication Society, 1953.
Hezekiah ben Manoah. Hizkuni. France, circa 1240. In, e.g., Chizkiyahu ben Manoach. Chizkuni: Torah Commentary. Translated and annotated by Eliyahu Munk, volume 4, pages 1178–91. Jerusalem: Ktav Publishers, 2013. .
Sefer ha-Chinuch, Sefer ha-Chinuch, commandments 606–11. Spain, 13th century. In, e.g., Sefer HaḤinnuch: The Book of [Mitzvah] Education. Translated by Charles Wengrov, volume 5, pages 414–31. Jerusalem: Feldheim Publishers, 1988.

Nachmanides. Commentary on the Torah. Jerusalem, circa 1270. In, e.g., Ramban (Nachmanides): Commentary on the Torah: Deuteronomy. Translated by Charles B. Chavel, volume 5, pages 307–30. New York: Shilo Publishing House, 1976. .
Bahya ben Asher. Commentary on the Torah. Spain, early 14th century. In, e.g., Midrash Rabbeinu Bachya: Torah Commentary by Rabbi Bachya ben Asher. Translated and annotated by Eliyahu Munk, volume 7, pages 2679–717. Jerusalem: Lambda Publishers, 2003. .
Isaac ben Moses Arama. Akedat Yizhak (The Binding of Isaac). Late 15th century. In, e.g., Yitzchak Arama. Akeydat Yitzchak: Commentary of Rabbi Yitzchak Arama on the Torah. Translated and condensed by Eliyahu Munk, volume 1, pages 881–93. New York, Lambda Publishers, 2001. .

Modern
Isaac Abravanel. Commentary on the Torah. Italy, between 1492 and 1509. In, e.g., Abarbanel: Selected Commentaries on the Torah: Volume 5: Devarim/Deuteronomy. Translated and annotated by Israel Lazar, pages 129–50. Brooklyn: CreateSpace, 2015. .
Obadiah ben Jacob Sforno. Commentary on the Torah. Venice, 1567. In, e.g., Sforno: Commentary on the Torah. Translation and explanatory notes by Raphael Pelcovitz, pages 954–73. Brooklyn: Mesorah Publications, 1997. .
Moshe Alshich. Commentary on the Torah. Safed, circa 1593. In, e.g., Moshe Alshich. Midrash of Rabbi Moshe Alshich on the Torah. Translated and annotated by Eliyahu Munk, volume 3, pages 1085–111. New York, Lambda Publishers, 2000. .
Avraham Yehoshua Heschel. Commentaries on the Torah. Cracow, Poland, mid 17th century. Compiled as Chanukat HaTorah. Edited by Chanoch Henoch Erzohn. Piotrkow, Poland, 1900. In Avraham Yehoshua Heschel. Chanukas HaTorah: Mystical Insights of Rav Avraham Yehoshua Heschel on Chumash. Translated by Avraham Peretz Friedman, pages 312–19. Southfield, Michigan: Targum Press/Feldheim Publishers, 2004. .

Thomas Hobbes. Leviathan, 3:42. England, 1651. Reprint edited by C. B. Macpherson, pages 547–48. Harmondsworth, England: Penguin Classics, 1982. .
Chaim ibn Attar. Ohr ha-Chaim. Venice, 1742. In Chayim ben Attar. Or Hachayim: Commentary on the Torah. Translated by Eliyahu Munk, volume 5, pages 1935–68. Brooklyn: Lambda Publishers, 1999. .

Samuel David Luzzatto (Shadal). Commentary on the Torah. Padua, 1871. In, e.g., Samuel David Luzzatto. Torah Commentary. Translated and annotated by Eliyahu Munk, volume 4, pages 1247–61. New York: Lambda Publishers, 2012. .
Yehudah Aryeh Leib Alter. Sefat Emet. Góra Kalwaria (Ger), Poland, before 1906. Excerpted in The Language of Truth: The Torah Commentary of Sefat Emet. Translated and interpreted by Arthur Green, pages 323–28. Philadelphia: Jewish Publication Society, 1998. . Reprinted 2012. .
John M. Powis Smith. "The Deuteronomic Tithe." The American Journal of Theology, volume 18 (number 1) (January 1914): pages 119–26.

Hermann Cohen. Religion of Reason: Out of the Sources of Judaism. Translated with an introduction by Simon Kaplan; introductory essays by Leo Strauss, pages 126, 152–53, 348. New York: Ungar, 1972. Reprinted Atlanta: Scholars Press, 1995. . Originally published as Religion der Vernunft aus den Quellen des Judentums. Leipzig: Gustav Fock, 1919.
Alexander Alan Steinbach. Sabbath Queen: Fifty-four Bible Talks to the Young Based on Each Portion of the Pentateuch, pages 158–61. New York: Behrman's Jewish Book House, 1936.
Joseph Reider. The Holy Scriptures: Deuteronomy with Commentary, pages 236–74. Philadelphia: Jewish Publication Society, 1937.
Thomas Mann. Joseph and His Brothers. Translated by John E. Woods, page 788. New York: Alfred A. Knopf, 2005. . Originally published as Joseph und seine Brüder. Stockholm: Bermann-Fischer Verlag, 1943.
Delbert R. Hillers. Treaty-Curses and the Old Testament Prophets. Rome: Pontifical Biblical Institute, 1964.

Martin Buber. On the Bible: Eighteen studies, pages 80–92, 122–30. New York: Schocken Books, 1968.
Barnabas Lindars. "Torah in Deuteronomy." In Words and Meanings: Essays Presented to David Winton Thomas. Edited by Peter R. Ackroyd and Barnabas Lindars, pages 117–36. Cambridge: Cambridge University Press, 1968. .
Otto Eissfeldt. "Gilgal or Shechem." In Proclamation and Presence: Old Testament Essays in Honour of Gwynne Henton Davies. Edited by John I. Durham and J. Roy Porter, pages 90–101. London: SCM Press, 1970. .
Jacob Milgrom. "First fruits, OT." In The Interpreter's Dictionary of the Bible. Supp. volume, pages 336–37. Nashville, Tenn.: Abingdon, 1976. .
Peter C. Craigie. The Problem of War in the Old Testament, pages 75, 87. Grand Rapids, Michigan: William B. Eerdmans Publishing Company, 1978. .
Nehama Leibowitz. Studies in Devarim: Deuteronomy, pages 257–97. Jerusalem: The World Zionist Organization, 1980.
Alan R. Millard. "A Wandering Aramean." Journal of Near Eastern Studies, volume 39 (number 2) (April 1980): pages 153–55.
Pinchas H. Peli. Torah Today: A Renewed Encounter with Scripture, pages 225–28. Washington, D.C.: B'nai B'rith Books, 1987. .
Patrick D. Miller. Deuteronomy, pages 177–208. Louisville: John Knox Press, 1990.
Mark S. Smith. The Early History of God: Yahweh and the Other Deities in Ancient Israel, pages 18, 128. New York: HarperSanFrancisco, 1990. .
A Song of Power and the Power of Song: Essays on the Book of Deuteronomy. Edited by Duane L. Christensen. Winona Lake, Indiana: Eisenbrauns, 1993. .
Judith S. Antonelli. "Festivals and Tithes." In In the Image of God: A Feminist Commentary on the Torah, pages 471–81. Northvale, New Jersey: Jason Aronson, 1995. .
Ellen Frankel. The Five Books of Miriam: A Woman's Commentary on the Torah, pages 286–91. New York: G. P. Putnam's Sons, 1996. .
Marc Gellman. "God's Mailbox." In God's Mailbox: More Stories About Stories in the Bible, pages 99–104. New York: Morrow Junior Books, 1996. .
Jack R. Lundbom. "The Inclusio and Other Framing Devices in Deuteronomy I–XXVIII." Vetus Testamentum, volume 46 (number 3) (July 1996): pages 296–315.

W. Gunther Plaut. The Haftarah Commentary, pages 489–99. New York: UAHC Press, 1996. .
Jeffrey H. Tigay. The JPS Torah Commentary: Deuteronomy: The Traditional Hebrew Text with the New JPS Translation, pages 238–77, 486–97. Philadelphia: Jewish Publication Society, 1996. .
Walter Homolka. "'God Is Thy Rescue' as the Central Message of the Seder Ritual: The Midrash on Devarim 26 in Its Biblical Context." European Judaism, volume 30 (number 2) (Autumn 1997): pages 72–85.
Sorel Goldberg Loeb and Barbara Binder Kadden. Teaching Torah: A Treasury of Insights and Activities, pages 329–34. Denver: A.R.E. Publishing, 1997. .
Susan Freeman. Teaching Jewish Virtues: Sacred Sources and Arts Activities, pages 4–6, 299–317. Springfield, New Jersey: A.R.E. Publishing, 1999. ..
Richard D. Nelson. "Deuteronomy." In The HarperCollins Bible Commentary. Edited by James L. Mays, pages 209–10. New York: HarperCollins Publishers, revised edition, 2000. .
Nancy Wechsler-Azen. "The Basket Ceremony of Gratitude and Hope." In The Women's Torah Commentary: New Insights from Women Rabbis on the 54 Weekly Torah Portions. Edited by Elyse Goldstein, pages 371–76. Woodstock, Vermont: Jewish Lights Publishing, 2000. .
Lainie Blum Cogan and Judy Weiss. Teaching Haftarah: Background, Insights, and Strategies, pages 342–47. Denver: A.R.E. Publishing, 2002. .

Michael Fishbane. The JPS Bible Commentary: Haftarot, pages 304–10. Philadelphia: Jewish Publication Society, 2002. .
Admiel Kosman. “The Story of a Giant Story: The Winding Way of Og King of Bashan in the Jewish Haggadic Tradition.” Hebrew Union College Annual, volume 73 (2002): pages 157–90.
Robert Alter. The Five Books of Moses: A Translation with Commentary, pages 1004–22. New York: W.W. Norton & Co., 2004. .
Bernard M. Levinson. "Deuteronomy." In The Jewish Study Bible. Edited by Adele Berlin and Marc Zvi Brettler, pages 423–33. New York: Oxford University Press, 2004. .
Professors on the Parashah: Studies on the Weekly Torah Reading Edited by Leib Moscovitz, pages 340–44. Jerusalem: Urim Publications, 2005. .
Hilary Lipka. Sexual Transgression in the Hebrew Bible. Sheffield Phoenix Press, 2006. ..
W. Gunther Plaut. The Torah: A Modern Commentary: Revised Edition. Revised edition edited by David E.S. Stern, pages 1347–71. New York: Union for Reform Judaism, 2006. .
Suzanne A. Brody. "Curses." In Dancing in the White Spaces: The Yearly Torah Cycle and More Poems, page 108. Shelbyville, Kentucky: Wasteland Press, 2007. .
Esther Jungreis. Life Is a Test, pages 245–46. Brooklyn: Shaar Press, 2007. .
James L. Kugel. How To Read the Bible: A Guide to Scripture, Then and Now, pages 246–47, 311–12, 345–49, 463, 508, 579. New York: Free Press, 2007. .
David Lincicum. "Greek Deuteronomy's 'Fever and Chills' and Their Magical Afterlife." Vetus Testamentum, volume 58 (number 4/5) (2008): pages 544–49.
The Torah: A Women's Commentary. Edited by Tamara Cohn Eskenazi and Andrea L. Weiss, pages 1191–216. New York: URJ Press, 2008. .
Eugene E. Carpenter. "Deuteronomy." In Zondervan Illustrated Bible Backgrounds Commentary. Edited by John H. Walton, volume 1, pages 505–12. Grand Rapids, Michigan: Zondervan, 2009. .
Reuven Hammer. Entering Torah: Prefaces to the Weekly Torah Portion, pages 287–91. New York: Gefen Publishing House, 2009. .
Shirley Idelson. "In a New Country: Parashat Ki Tavo (Deuteronomy 26:1–29:8)." In Torah Queeries: Weekly Commentaries on the Hebrew Bible. Edited by Gregg Drinkwater, Joshua Lesser, and David Shneer; foreword by Judith Plaskow, pages 259–62. New York: New York University Press, 2009. .
Julie Cadwallader-Staub. Joy. In Face to Face: A Poetry Collection. DreamSeeker Books, 2010. . ("land of milk and honey").
Idan Dershowitz. "A Land Flowing with Fat and Honey." Vetus Testamentum, volume 60 (number 2) (2010): pages 172–76.
Naftali S. Cohn. The Memory of the Temple and the Making of the Rabbis, introduction. Philadelphia: University of Pennsylvania Press, 2012. . (analysis of the Mishnaic retelling of the first fruits ceremony).

William G. Dever. The Lives of Ordinary People in Ancient Israel: When Archaeology and the Bible Intersect, pages 46, 192–93. Grand Rapids, Michigan: William B. Eerdmans Publishing Company, 2012. .
Shmuel Herzfeld. "The Joy of Selichot." In Fifty-Four Pick Up: Fifteen-Minute Inspirational Torah Lessons, pages 284–89. Jerusalem: Gefen Publishing House, 2012. .
Elyse Goldstein. "Do it Today: What an interesting experience it would be if we looked upon Judaism every day as if it was brand new." The Jerusalem Report, volume 25 (number 12) (September 22, 2014): page 47.

Shlomo Riskin. Torah Lights: Devarim: Moses Bequeaths Legacy, History, and Covenant, pages 269–314. New Milford, Connecticut: Maggid Books, 2014. .
The Commentators' Bible: The Rubin JPS Miqra'ot Gedolot: Deuteronomy. Edited, translated, and annotated by Michael Carasik, pages 172–95. Philadelphia: Jewish Publication Society, 2015. .

Jonathan Sacks. Lessons in Leadership: A Weekly Reading of the Jewish Bible, pages 275–80. New Milford, Connecticut: Maggid Books, 2015. .
Jonathan Sacks. Essays on Ethics: A Weekly Reading of the Jewish Bible, pages 311–15. New Milford, Connecticut: Maggid Books, 2016. .
Shai Held. The Heart of Torah, Volume 2: Essays on the Weekly Torah Portion: Leviticus, Numbers, and Deuteronomy, pages 260–69. Philadelphia: Jewish Publication Society, 2017. .
Steven Levy and Sarah Levy. The JPS Rashi Discussion Torah Commentary, pages 171–73. Philadelphia: Jewish Publication Society, 2017. .
Pekka Pitkänen. "Ancient Israelite Population Economy: Ger, Toshav, Nakhri and Karat as Settler Colonial Categories." Journal for the Study of the Old Testament, volume 42 (number 2) (December 2017): pages 139–53.
Ernst Wendland. Deuteronomy: translationNotes. Orlando, Florida: unfoldingWord, 2017.
Jonathan Sacks. Covenant & Conversation: A Weekly Reading of the Jewish Bible: Deuteronomy: Renewal of the Sinai Covenant, pages 219–51. New Milford, Connecticut: Maggid Books, 2019.
J. Andrew Cowan. "The Curse of the Law, the Covenant, and Anthropology in Galatians 3:10–14: An Examination of Paul's Use of Deuteronomy 27:26." Journal of Biblical Literature, volume 139, number 1 (2020): pages 211–29.
Andrew Tobolowsky. "The Problem of Reubenite Primacy: New Paradigms, New Answers." Journal of Biblical Literature, volume 139, number 1 (2020): pages 27–45.

External links

Texts
Masoretic text and 1917 JPS translation
Hear the parashah chanted 
Hear the parashah read in Hebrew
Hebrew and English translation

Commentaries

Academy for Jewish Religion, New York
Aish.com
Akhlah: The Jewish Children's Learning Network
Aleph Beta Academy
American Jewish University — Ziegler School of Rabbinic Studies
Anshe Emes Synagogue, Los Angeles 
Ari Goldwag
Ascent of Safed
Bar-Ilan University
Chabad.org
eparsha.com
G-dcast
The Israel Koschitzky Virtual Beit Midrash
Jewish Agency for Israel
Jewish Theological Seminary
Mechon Hadar
MyJewishLearning.com
Ohr Sameach
ON Scripture — The Torah
Orthodox Union
OzTorah, Torah from Australia
Oz Ve Shalom — Netivot Shalom
Pardes from Jerusalem
Professor James L. Kugel
Professor Michael Carasik
Rabbi Fabian Werbin
Rabbi Jonathan Sacks
Rabbi Shlomo Riskin
Rabbi Shmuel Herzfeld
Rabbi Stan Levin
Reconstructionist Judaism 
Sephardic Institute
Shiur.com
613.org Jewish Torah Audio
Tanach Study Center
Teach613.org, Torah Education at Cherry Hill
TheTorah.com
Torah from Dixie
Torah.org
TorahVort.com
Union for Reform Judaism
United Synagogue of Conservative Judaism
What's Bothering Rashi?
Yeshivat Chovevei Torah
Yeshiva University

Weekly Torah readings in Elul
Weekly Torah readings from Deuteronomy